The Dickinson Red Devils football program represents Dickinson College in college football at the NCAA Division III level. The Red Devils have competed as members of the Centennial Conference since 1983 and play their home games at the Biddle Field Complex in Carlisle, Pennsylvania. Brad Fordyce has served as the team's head coach since 2017.

Dickinson adopted the "Red Devils" nickname in 1930 after they were dubbed such by a writer from the Public Ledger. They had been known as the Red and White previously.

Dickinson has won nine Centennial Conference titles: five consecutive under Ed Sweeney (1986–1990) and four under Darwin Breaux (1993, 1994, 2004, 2007). The Red Devils have appeared in the NCAA Division III Football Championship playoffs four times, in 1989, 1991, 1994, 2006, losing in the first round each time.

References

External links
 

 
American football teams established in 1885
1885 establishments in Pennsylvania